The Mysterious Airman (a.k.a. Mysterious Airman and The Mystery Airman ) is a 1928 American black-and-white 10-chapter silent film serial from Weiss Brothers Artclass Pictures. The serial involves a mysterious airman who is after the aviation inventions from a new aircraft company.The Mysterious Airman was one of the last Hollywood silent film serials and, until recently, thought to be a lost film.

Plot
Jack Baker (Walter Miller) is an aviation engineer, pilot, and president of the Baker Aircraft Company. He has invented new aviation innovations to be mounted on his company's aircraft.

The owners of Globe Air Corporation, a rival aviation company, are after these new inventions. Their president, William Craft (Robert Walker), hires a masked and mysterious airman, known only as "Pilot X", who also makes plans to steal those inventions for his own use. He uses a trained monkey to steal one of them, a radio-controlled "flying torpedo", that was in engineer Baker's workshop. In the air, his gang of "Air Hawks" pose serious peril to the Baker Aircraft Company.

The attacks are largely aimed at stealing Baker's exclusive rights to the "Aerometer", invented by James B. Joyce (C. H. Allen), a new navigational instrument that makes flying safer in all sorts of weather, even at night. The inventor's daughter, Shirley (Eugenia Gilbert), is an aviatrix who is Baker's fiancée.

"World-famous aviatrix" Fawn Nesbitt (Dorothy Talcott), who hopes to become the first female pilot to fly around the world, becomes concerned when Baker's aircraft begin crashing. She is to be married to Albert Orren (Eugene Burr), the owner of a rival aircraft company.

As the air attacks mount, Baker and Shirley are in constant danger, both on the ground and above the clouds. Their efforts always seem to be known to the mysterious Pilot X, and suspicion falls on Perkins (Arthur Morrison), Joyce's butler, who is always nearby when plans are being discussed.

Chapter titles
 The Winged Avenger (16 minutes)
 The Sky Writer (20 minutes)
 The Girl Who Flew Alone (20 minutes)
 The Smoke Screen (20 minutes)
 Test Flight (20 minutes)
 The Hawk's Nest (20 minutes)
 The Faker Pilot (20 minutes)
 The Air Raft (20 minutes)
 The Hidden Hangar (20 minutes)
 Mystery Pilot X (20 minutes)

Cast
 Walter Miller as Jack Baker
 Eugenia Gilbert as Shirley Joyce
 Robert Walker as William Craft
 Eugene Burr as Albert Orren
 Dorothy Tallcot as Fawn Nesbitt
 James A. Fitzgerald as Barney Madden
 C.H. Allen as James Joyce
 Ray Childs as Henry Knight
 Hugh Blair as Detective Mullens
 Arthur Morrison as Perkins
 Hamilton Morse as Mardos Kartoff

Production
The Mysterious Airman was written by famed mystery novelist Arthur B. Reeve of Craig Kennedy, Scientific Detective fame. The serial was the last silent serial produced by poverty row producers, the Weiss Brothers, and came at the end of the silent film era. Although production values were modest, a number of aircraft were featured, both on the ground and in the air. These aircraft included a Waco ATO, fitted with a machine gun and was flown by Pilot X.

Reception
A modern appraisal of The Mysterious Airman was published in the Schenectady (NY) Gazette and notes that it is "Superior to the usual run of serials ... full of thrills ...”

Preservation status
The Mysterious Airman was thought to be a “lost” silent film. In 2004, after producer Kit Parker (of Kit Parker Films) purchased the holdings of Weiss Global International, Parker was approached by film archivist Jeff Joseph of SabuCat Productions. Joseph offered to loan Parker his near-complete original 35mm tinted nitrate film print of the serial. His print was missing only the first reel of Chapter Nine, due to reel's decomposition.

Once restored (including recreating the missing reel from film stills and plot synopses) and digitally restored, The Mysterious Airman was released October 17, 2017 on DVD by VCI Video (Sprocket Vault). Additional features include a commentary track by historian Richard M. Roberts, Flying Cadets (1928), a 2-reel United States Army Air Corps documentary film short, and a gallery of original The Mysterious Airman posters and lobby cards.

See also
 List of film serials by year
 List of film serials by studio

References

Notes

Citations

Bibliography

 Farmer, James H. Celluloid Wings: The Impact of Movies on Aviation. Blue Ridge Summit, Pennsylvania: Tab Books Inc., 1984. .
 Rainey, Buck. Serials and Series: A World Filmography, 1912–1956. Jefferson, North Carolina: McFarland & Company, Inc., 2010. .

External links
 
 
 

1928 films
1928 crime films
American black-and-white films
American aviation films
American crime films
1920s English-language films
1920s American films